David Littler may refer to:
David Littler, British member of the Houghton Weavers
David Littler, former British member of The Spitfire Boys 
David T. Littler (1836–1902), American politician and lawyer